Scheider is a German surname. Notable people with the surname include:

Roy Scheider, American actor
Timo Scheider, German race car driver

See also 
 Scheid (surname)
 Scheidemann
 Schneider (disambiguation)

German-language surnames
Occupational surnames